The Mangbetu is African tribe part of Democratic Republic of the Congo, living in the Orientale Province. The people of this tribe produced a large variety of highly developed art and music, such as harps, guitars, pots, and other crafts. Their pots are still prominent in today's art spectrum, and ones that have been constructed in the early days of the tribe are sold to collectors and people alike for high prices.

Background
Their language is known as Kingbetu, which is part of the Central Sudanic language family. The people of the Mangbetu tribes are known today for their elongated heads, as per tradition, when a baby is born into the tribe their soft heads are wrapped tightly with a cloth to shape it into a long, protruding shape. This long-standing practice is still a custom today, as it is a sign of beauty in Mangbetu culture.

Purpose
The Mangbetu people constructed three types of pots: the Large Pot (also known as nembwo), the Small Pot, and sculpted/decorated pots. The nembwo is used to serve general purposes, such as getting water from the lake and carrying vegetables. The smaller pots were used for more specific tasks such as cooking, cleaning, and pouring. A few were used as toilets. The decorative pots were made more as a hobby, and nowadays used as collector's items and can fetch a high price in art auctions.

Shape
The nembwo and Small Pot have a very rotund shape, not straying far from the conventional pot shape. More spherical than most due to how it is constructed, most are thin and smooth with a thicker opening. The more decorated and sculpted pots of the Mangbetu tribe have human or animal figures (mostly their heads) at the opening of the jar. Occasionally this sculpted figure is a Mangbetu women with the traditional. The handles of these pots are sometimes molded and shaped into animal or human parts. The bottom of the pot is round, and occasionally patterns will be carved onto the surface.

Adornment and color
Mangbetu pots are mostly mono-chromatic, made entirely with clay and fired in its natural form. As a result, most decorative pots are a dark gray color while the nembwo and Small Pots lean more towards russet. To serve as a decorative quality, patterns are often carved onto the surface of the pots in addition to the animal/human figures. Many times these patterns are very thin, long lines that cover most of the pot. More often than not, they are circular or wavy.

Construction
Mangbetu women and men make their pots and jars using relatively coarse-textured clay entirely by hand, either by building the clay up in rings or using a variation of the hammer-and-anvil technique. They mold the heads and figures on the openings and handles, while the patterns on the surface are carved using small tools, such as shell scrapers and wooden roulettes. After the pottery is formed, they are fired in open bonfires.

See also
Pottery
Glossary of pottery terms
Mangbetu people
African art

Further reading
Phillips, Ruth B., and Christopher Burghard Steiner. Unpacking culture art and commodity in colonial and postcolonial worlds. Berkeley: University of California Press, 1999. Print.

References

External links

See Mangbetu Works in the Brooklyn Museum
See Mangbetu Collections at The Metropolitan Museum

Democratic Republic of the Congo culture
African pottery